Anni 90: Parte II is a 1993 Italian sketch comedy film directed by Enrico Oldoini.

The film is an anthological sequel to the 1992 comedy Anni 90.

Cast

References

External links

1993 films
Films directed by Enrico Oldoini
1990s Italian-language films
1993 comedy films
Italian comedy films
Sketch comedy films
1990s Italian films